The 2018–19 Belgian Basketball Cup was the 65th edition of Belgium's national basketball cup tournament. Telenet Giants Antwerp won its third cup title.

Bracket

See also
2018–19 Pro Basketball League

References

Belgian Basketball Cup
Cup